The House of Loredan is a Venetian noble family of supposed ancient Roman origin, which has played a significant role in shaping the history of the entire Mediterranean. A political dynasty, the family has throughout the centuries produced a number of famous personalities: doges, statesmen, magnates, financiers, diplomats, procurators, military commanders, naval captains, church dignitaries, writers, and lawyers.

In the centuries following the fall of the Western Roman Empire, the Loredans were lords in Emilia-Romagna, from where they came to Venice in the early 11th century. Settling there, the family grew in power in the High Middle Ages, amassing great wealth on the lucrative silk and spice trade, and in the following centuries it would become powerful and influential in regions across the Mediterranean, playing a significant role in shaping its history throughout the Late Middle Ages, the Renaissance and the early modern period. The family was present in virtually every home and overseas territory of the Republic of Venice, and at various points in history, its members have held titles in what are now modern countries of Italy, Austria, Slovenia, Croatia, Montenegro, Albania, France, Greece and Cyprus, and conducted trade operations as far as Egypt, Persia, India and China. Alongside other families of Venice's urban nobility, they have played a major role in fostering mercantilism and early capitalism.

Although the Loredans were proponents of Venice's traditional, maritime orientation, and viewed with distrust its expansion on the Italian mainland, they have played a key role in the territorial development, and ultimately, the history of the Republic of Venice, helping to expand its Mainland Dominions and the State of the Sea. The family was significant in the War of the League of Cambrai, with Doge Leonardo Loredan leading Venice to a victory against the Papal States, which resulted in the pope having to pay the Loredan family a financial settlement of approximately 500,000 ducats, an enormous amount of money, making them one of the richest families in the world at the time. Furthermore, many of its members distinguished themselves as admirals and generals in defending Europe from the Ottoman conquests in the Ottoman-Venetian wars. Their naval triumphs have been honoured with the MV Loredan auxiliary cruiser of the Italian Royal Navy.

The family has also played a crucial role in the creation of modern opera with the Accademia degli Incogniti, also called the Loredanian Academy, and has commissioned many works of art by artists of the Venetian School, including Giovanni and Gentile Bellini, Giorgione, Vittore Carpaccio, Vincenzo Catena, Sebastiano del Piombo, Titian, Paris Bordone, Jacopo and Domenico Tintoretto, Paolo Veronese, Palma il Giovane, Canaletto, Pietro Longhi and Francesco Guardi, among others. At the height of the Renaissance, the family's residences were being designed and constructed by renowned architects, notably Mauro Codussi, Jacopo Sansovino, and Andrea Palladio. Loredan palaces remain some of the most beautiful ever built in Venice.

The wealth of the Loredan family in Venice was legendary, likely reaching its height in the 18th century, when they owned numerous palaces, as well as hundreds of estates and vast land holdings across the territories of the Republic, primarily in the Veneto, Friuli, Istria and Dalmatia. Besides the silk and spice trade, they also participated in the medieval slave trade, and were, more than once, accused of usury and sodomy, often by long-time political rivals such as the Faliero and Foscari families. In cases of corruption, assault, murder and other scandals, when members of their own family were involved, the Loredans usually pursued a policy of lenience and outright tolerance, and aimed to resolve relating accusations by means of threats or bribery.

Under a Loredan government, the first Jewish ghetto in the world was created in Venice in 1516, although some members of the family argued in the Senate for the reduction of the sum the Jews had to pay for their "conduct". In the 17th century onwards, the Loredans were noted for supporting and taking in Jews arriving in Venice, several of whom adopted the 'Loredan' name in recognition of the family's generosity.

Today, the Loredan coat of arms, which features six laurel (or rose) flowers on a shield of yellow and blue, is displayed on numerous buildings and palaces across the territories previously held by the Republic of Venice; from the Veneto and Friuli, Istria and Dalmatia, and in the more distant possessions such as the Ionian Islands and Crete. In Venice, it is even carved into the Rialto Bridge and the façade of St. Mark's Basilica.

Origin and etymology 

Some historians traced the origin of the family back to the Mainardi family, in turn descended from Gaius Mucius Scaevola. They then acquired the surname of Laureati because of their ancestors’ historical glory. Also, according to legend, they founded the city of Loreo in 816 AD, and moved to the Venetian Lagoon in 1015 AD. The first written references of the family, however, date from the 11th century.

According to what the 16th century Italian philosopher Jacopo Zabarella wrote in his Trasea Peto, the Loredans were already lords of Bertinoro in Emilia-Romagna, and were of illustrious ancient lineage derived from Rome, where they earned great fame for the many victories they achieved in battles. They were thus called Laurae by the Romans, then Laureati for their excellence and later Lauretani for corruption, because of which they were driven out of Bertinoro. They then went to Ferrara, and finally to Venice, where they built the Castle of Loredo. Because of their nobility, as well as for the wealth they possessed, they were ascribed by the Republic to its Great Council in 1080, with the person of Marco Loredan. Zabarella also notes the family owned the lordship of Antipario (today Antiparos, Greece) in the Aegean Sea, and more recently the county of Ormelle in the Province of Treviso.

The name of the family may also have originated from the word for the flower laurel, a symbol of triumph and nobility. The coat of arms of the Loredan family features six laurel flowers.

The name may also mean "coming from Loreo", as to describe a person who is from the homonymous town. Citizens of Loreo are today called "Loredani".

In addition to the Venetian branch, there was also a Sicilian branch (Loredans of Sicily).

Cadet branches 

Throughout history, the family was organised and divided into many branches, most of which were traditionally named after Venetian toponyms, usually parishes, as was common with Venetian nobility. Some of the branches are: Santo Stefano (extinct in 1767), San Pantaleone della Frescada, San Cancian, San Vio, Santa Maria (Formosa and Nova), San Luca, San Marcilian, Sant’Aponal etc. Pietro Loredan, a member of the San Cancian branch, is also the progenitor of the branches of Santa Maria Formosa and Nova by his sons Giacomo and Polo.

Santo Stefano

The family branch of Santo Stefano (also called San Vitale) was settled in the Palazzo Loredan in Campo S. Stefano. The progenitor of this branch is considered to be Gerolamo Loredan di S. Vitale, father of Doge Leonardo Loredan. Besides Leonardo, the branch also gave Doge Francesco Loredan, as well as Dogaressa Caterina Loredan and the ambassador Francesco Loredan. This branch was also significant as its members were feudal owners of the towns of Barban and Rakalj in Istria, which they acquired in an auction in 1535 for 14,700 ducats. The main (agnatic) line of the branch of Santo Stefano ended with Andrea di Girolamo Loredan, who died young in 1750, though the branch became extinct in 1767 with the death of Giovanni Loredan, brother of Doge Francesco.

San Pantaleone della Frescada

The family branch of San Pantaleone della Frescada was settled around the Church of San Pantaleone Martire in the Dorsoduro district of Venice, near the Rio della Frescada canal. This branch was the one that gave Doge Pietro Loredan.

San Cancian

The family branch of San Cancian was settled in the Palazzo Loredan a San Cancian in the Cannaregio district of Venice. This branch is known to have produced an illustrious dynasty of admirals and politicians including Pietro Loredan (1372-1438), Alvise Loredan (1393-1466), Giacomo Loredan (1396-1471), Giorgio Loredan (d. 1475), Antonio Loredan (1446-1514), as well as the Duke of Candia Giovanni Loredan (d. 1420).

Santa Maria

The family branch of Santa Maria draws its name from the parishes of Santa Maria Formosa and Santa Maria dei Miracoli, around which it was historically settled. Its progenitor is considered to be the admiral and procurator Pietro Loredan, by his sons Giacomo and Polo. One of its most notable members is Antonio Loredan, governor of Venetian Dalmatia, Albania and Morea, known for the successful defence of Scutari in 1474 from the Ottomans. He also served as the Captain General of the Sea in the Venetian navy, as did his father and grandfather. Giovanni Loredan, Lord of Antiparos, is significant for building the Castle of Antiparos in 1440 and bringing inhabitants to the island at his own expense. Taddea Caterina Loredan, Duchess of the Archipelago was the wife of Francesco III Crispo, known as the "Mad Duke", who murdered her in 1510. Giovanni Francesco Loredan was a writer and politician who played a significant role in the creation of modern opera with his Accademia degli Incogniti. Marco Loredan was a senator and politician, as well as Count of Brescia, Feltre, Rovigo, Salò and Famagusta.

San Vio

The family branch of San Vio (with the Palazzo Loredan Cini) was historically settled in Campo San Vio in the Dorsoduro district of Venice. The branch still exists today.

History

13th century: The Serrata, silk, spices and slavery 

The Loredan family has been occupying hereditary seats on the Great Council since the Great Council Lockout (Serrata del Maggior Consiglio) of 1297, by which the membership in the Great Council of Venice became a hereditary title, and was limited to the families inscribed in the Golden Book of Italian nobility. This resulted in the exclusion of minor aristocrats and plebeians from participating in the Government of the Republic.

Like many Venetian patricians, the Loredans participated in the lucrative silk and spice trade, thus growing their wealth and influence, with Venice and other maritime republics monopolising European trade with the Middle East. The family also participated in the medieval slave trade, with Venice already having established slave trading operations centuries prior.

Around this time, documents from the 1290s show that two Loredans, Zanetto and Zorzi, were being sued by Christian merchants from Amalfi, presumably for involvement in piracy activities, as they had seized a vessel of the coast of Malta.

14th century: Conspiracies and expansion of trade 
Some members of the family played a part in the bloody Tiepoline conspiracy of 1310, which involved the Querini, Badoer and other families of the old aristocracy, in an attempt to overthrow the state, primarily the doge and the Great Council. Evidence indicates the Loredans initially supported the conspiracy, having recently married into the Tiepolo family. The plot failed due to treachery, bad planning, insufficient popular support and stormy weather. The rebels were stopped near Piazza San Marco by forces faithful to Doge Pietro Gradenigo and defeated. On the night before the uprising, particulars of the plot were unveiled to the doge and his advisors; the Loredans who were involved in the conspiracy passed cunningly to the other side, and to show their loyalty to the doge, they hounded the involved conspirators until they were found.

The Loredans are characterised by many interesting things and stories, one of which took place in the early 14th century: In 1316, Zanotto Loredan was seriously ill, so much so that it was thought he was dead, so the people took him to the church of San Matteo in Murano for burial. After the funeral rite, they wanted to deposit the body in the tomb, when someone noticed that the color of his face had changed. They took him to the convent hospital, warmed him and he recovered. Later he continued to live normally, married and had children.

On the influence exerted by the travels of the Marco Polo, new documents have come to light from archival research. From these it is noted that, starting as early as the 1320s, Venetian merchants flocked to Persia (where from 1324 Venice had its own consul in Tabriz), India and China, where they formed trade companies. Head of one of these companies was Giovanni Loredan, whose venture along with five other nobles is a representative example of a commenda, known in Venice as colleganza, an early form of limited partnership, which implied an agreement between an investing partner and a travelling partner to conduct a commercial enterprise, usually overseas. Their journey began in 1338 when they sailed on the galleys of Romania to Tana in order to embark upon a voyage to Delhi. Following the travels of the Polos, a number of Venetians travelled across Central Asia to China. However, striking out east from Tana and then heading south around the edge of the Pamir mountains to cross the Hindu Kush mountains to India had not been done before; it was trying something new. Before this, Giovanni Loredan had just come back from a trip to China, and his wife and children therefore tried to dissuade him from the new voyage. However, Giovanni believed that there was a fortune to be made by a visit to a certain Indian prince, who had a reputation for cruelty but also generosity to foreign merchants. Therefore, Giovanni, along with five other nobles who had joined in the venture, including his brother Paolo, pooled funds together in order to bring with them gifts, mechanical wonders such as a clock and a fountain, which they hoped would please the Indian prince. Each of them also took some wares on their own account, with Giovanni Loredan taking some Florentine cloth, a piece of which he sold along the way to pay for expenses. In order to raise his share of the needed funds, Giovanni also accepted money in the colleganza from his father-in-law, Alberto Calli, who invested 6 ducats. Having made their way to Delhi, Giovanni and the other nobles succeeded in pleasing the Indian prince, as he gave them a rich present, which they then invested in a joint purchase of pearls. However, the journey turned out tragically, as Giovanni and two other nobles died in the course of the journey. Giovanni's brother Paolo assumed his dead brother's obligations and continued the journey. On the way home, the pearls were divided among the surviving partners, but Giovanni was not there to make the most of the outcome that he had imagined before the voyage. After the nobles returned home to Venice,  Giovanni's father-in-law, an early investor in the colleganza, sued the guardians of Giovanni's young sons to recover not only the value of his investment, but also the usual profits from such a voyage. Despite winning the case, he was almost certainly disappointed when he did not even double his initial investment in what had been projected to be a highly lucrative enterprise. The voyage of the Loredan brothers is one of the most popular anecdotes used by historians to depict the burgeoning of a global economy during that time.

One of the most notorious usurers of the time was Leonardo Loredan (d. 1349), borrowing at interest rates of 65% to 100%. His representatives did not hesitate to put families out of their homes, he battened on war loans, and was arraigned by ecclesiastical courts to answer to charges of aggravated usury, but he always managed to confute the charges by means of gifts, bribery and occult levers. Later, much of his wealth went into building two Loredan palaces in the city.
After the infamous failed 1355 Faliero coup that involved Doge Marino Faliero and his partners, including Filippo Calendario, which attempted to overthrow the republican government and establish a dictatorship, Andrea and Daniele Loredan managed to produce a testimony against Faliero, regarding his secret plots against the ruling class, after which they manipulated the Council of Ten and then led the call for his brutal torture. On the night of 17 April 1355, over the space of a few hours, they had Faliero questioned, framed, tortured and beheaded. Additionally, ten of his accomplices were hanged on display from the balcony of the Doge's Palace.

Marco Loredan, who lived in the 14th century was elected as Procurator of Saint Mark, one of the highest political positions in the Venetian Republic, and was one of the electors of Doge Andrea Dandolo. Contemporary to him are Paolo Loredan (d. 1372), a military general who distinguished himself in the highest military positions of land and sea, and Alvise Loredan, who also became Procurator of Saint Mark.

Giovanni Loredan (lat. Ioannes Lauredanus) served as the Bishop of Capo d'Istria (today Koper, Slovenia) from 1390 until his death on 11 April 1411. From 1354 he was the presbyter of Saint Mark's Basilica, Venice. He was appointed Bishop of Capo d'Istria on 21 November 1390. According to several church chronologies, before that he was also a bishop in Venice, in what was then the Diocese of Castello. It is recorded that in 1391 he dedicated the Church of St. George in Piran. He was buried in the Cathedral of the Assumption of the Blessed Virgin Mary in Koper. In some historical sources he is mentioned under the name of Giacomo or the Slovenian Jakob.

15th century: Political and military rise 
One of the important members of the family in the 15th century was Pietro Loredan (1372-1438), who was three times Captain General of the Sea; in 1416 he conquered several Dalmatian strongholds and later defeated the Ottomans at Gallipoli, capturing fifteen galleys; in 1431 he defeated the Genoese and Milanese in Rapallo, achieving the capture of eight galleys and General Francesco Spinola. Pietro died in 1439. He was buried in the Monastery of St. Helena, and the funeral inscription explicitly indicates poisoning as the cause of his death. Many historians identify the principal to be his long-time rival, Doge Francesco Foscari, whose enmity with the deceased Pietro was well-known. In the popular imagination, the names of the Foscari and Loredan remain linked to a sort of generational feud, partly documented, partly due to certain historiographic forcing; and yet it is undeniable how, in the crucial moments that marked the life of Francesco and his son Jacopo Foscari, a Loredan was always present.

Loredan's letter following the Battle of Gallipoli and addressed to the Doge of Venice has been preserved:

Pietro's son Giacomo Loredan was a general who served as Captain of the Gulf and three times as Captain General of the Sea in the Venetian Navy. He defeated the Ottomans in 1464.

Also significant at this time was Alvise Loredan (1393-1466), who became a galley captain at a young age and served with distinction as a military commander, with a long record of battles against the Ottomans, from the naval expeditions to aid Thessalonica, to the Crusade of Varna, and the opening stages of the Ottoman-Venetian war, as well as the Wars in Lombardy against the Duchy of Milan. The Loredans were proponents of Venice's traditional, maritime orientation, and viewed with distrust its expansion on the Italian mainland (the Terraferma), which had brought it into conflict with Milan. Alvise Loredan shared this view, as can be seen from a proposal he brought before the Great Council in February 1442, ordering the governors of Bergamo to demolish its fortifications as a sign of goodwill and trust towards Visconti, following the conclusion of peace with Milan at the Treaty of Cremona. He also served in a number of high government positions, as provincial governor, Savio del Consiglio, and Procuratore de Supra of Saint Mark's Basilica, and was Count of Bergamo and Belluno. He died in Venice on 6 March 1466, and was buried in the Church of Santa Maria dei Servi.

Giorgio Loredan (d. 1475) was an admiral, military general and politician, known for investigating political crimes and scandals as head of the Council of Ten. He was also Count of Zara, Chioggia and Padua.

Antonio Loredan (1420-1482) was captain of Venetian-held Scutari and governor in Split (Venetian Dalmatia), Venetian Albania and the Morea. He is famous for the successful defence of Scutari from Sultan Mehmed II's Ottoman forces led by Hadım Suleiman Pasha. According to some sources, when the Scutari garrison complained for lack of food and water, Loredan told them: "If you are hungry, here is my flesh; if you are thirsty, I give you my blood." He also served as the Captain General of the Sea and is notable for commissioning the Legend of Saint Ursula (1497/98), a series of large wall-paintings by Vittore Carpaccio originally created for Scuola di Sant'Orsola which was under the patronage of the Loredan family.

Giovanni Loredan, Lord of Antiparos built the Castle of Antiparos in 1440 and brought inhabitants to the island at his own expense. He married Maria Sommaripa, of the ruling family of Paros, and they had a daughter, Lucrezia Loredan, Lady of Ios and Therasia.

Andrea Loredan (1455-1499) was an admiral and the Duke of Corfù, best known for his successful exploits against pirates who raged across the Adriatic and the Mediterranean. He fought at sea against famous admirals such as Kemāl Reis, stealing from him multiple boats and destroying many by fire, and Pedro Navarro, whom he managed to wound after six hours of fierce battle in Roccella Ionica near Crotone in 1497. Andrea died on a burning ship while fighting against the Ottomans in the Battle of Zonchio in August 1499.

Antonio Loredan (1446-1514) was the Duke of Friuli, and ambassador to the Papal States, the Kingdom of France and the Holy Roman Empire.

In that same century, Luigi and Giacomo Loredan, both Procurators of Saint Mark, distinguished themselves with important political positions.

Leonardo Loredan, born in 1436 to Gerolamo Loredan di S. Vitale and Donata Donà di Natale, was the first doge of the Loredan family. He had a good classical education, focusing on literature, after which he devoted himself to trade in Africa and the Levant to increase the family's finances, where he made his fortune. In 1461, he married Giustina Giustiniani, of the wealthy branch of S. Moisè, with whom he had nine children: Lorenzo (who became Procurator of St. Mark's), Girolamo (the only one to continue the branch), Alvise, Vincenzo (died in Tripoli in 1499), Bernardo, Donata, Maria (wife of Giovanni Venier, of the branch that gave birth to Doge Francesco Venier), Paola (wife of Giovanni Alvise Venier, descendant of Doge Antonio Venier), and Elisabetta.

Leonardo's political ascent began at the age of nineteen, when he became a lawyer in the "Giudici di Petizion", a magistracy concerned mainly with financial scandals and bankruptcies, for which he had Filippo Loredan as guarantor. During his political career, he held multiple high positions such as chamberlain of the Comùn, wise man of the council, podestà of Padua, and Procurator of Saint Mark's. On 31 March 1495, he was one of the three designated by Doge Agostino Barbarigo to negotiate the alliance between Venice, Pope Alexander VI, Holy Roman Emperor Maximilian I of Habsburg, the Spanish rulers Ferdinand V and Isabella I and the Duke of Milan Ludovico Maria Sforza (King Henry VII of England also joined), with the aim of countering the military operations of the King of France Charles VIII who had, almost without encountering military resistance, entered Naples in February. The army of the League, led by the Marquis of Mantua Francesco II Gonzaga, in the Battle of Fornovo on 6 July forced the French army to withdraw from Italian territory. In October of the same year, Loredan signed the agreement for the conduct of Niccolò Orsini, count of Pitigliano, to the services of the Republic of Venice as governor general of the land militias for the period of three to four years. In January 1497, Loredan, with the wise man of the Terraferma Lodovico Venier, ratified the surrender of Taranto on behalf of the Doge.

16th century: The Ottomans and the League of Cambrai 

On the death of Doge Agostino Barbarigo (20 September 1501), Leonardo Loredan was one of the designated candidates in the election of the new doge, which began on 27 September and ended on 2 October with Loredan coming out first with 27 votes in the sixth hand of the first ballot. The election was successful thanks to his and his wife's influential relations and the sudden death of the most popular opponent, the wealthy procurator Filippo Tron, son of Doge Nicolò Tron. Leonardo became the 75th Doge of the Venetian Republic and his dogeship is considered one of the most important in the history of Venice.

Ottoman-Venetian War 

At the time of his accession to the dogeship, Venice was engaged in the second Ottoman-Venetian war, and Leonardo had lost his cousin Andrea Loredan, a naval officer, in the disastrous Battle of Zonchio. The war proceeded badly on land too, with the Venetians losing considerable territory. This included the strategic city of Modon, which was the site of a bloody battle involving hand-to-hand combat, followed by the beheading of hundreds of Venetians following the Turkish victory. The war took a heavy toll on the Venetian economy, and in 1502/1503 Loredan agreed a peace treaty with the Ottomans. He was helped in negotiations by Andrea Gritti, a Venetian who had been conducting trade in Constantinople and would later become Doge of Venice himself.

War of the League of Cambrai 

Upon the death of Pope Alexander VI in 1503, Venice occupied several territories in the northern Papal States. When Julius II was elected as Alexander's eventual successor, the Venetians expected their seizure of papal territory to be tacitly accepted, as Julius had been nicknamed Il Veneziano for his pro-Venetian sympathies. But instead the new Pope excommunicated the Republic and demanded the land be returned. The Republic of Venice, although willing to acknowledge Papal sovereignty over these port cities along the Adriatic coast and willing to pay Julius II an annual tribute, refused to surrender the cities themselves. In 1508, Julius formed an alliance called the League of Cambrai, uniting the Papal States with France, the Holy Roman Empire and several other Christian states.

The Doge's problems did not end in Europe. In 1509, the Battle of Diu took place, in India, where the Portuguese fleet defeated an Ottoman and Mameluk fleet, which had been transferred from the Mediterranean Sea to the Red Sea with Venetian help. The defeat marked the end of the profitable Spice trade, which was bought by Venetians from the Mameluks in Egypt and in turn monopolised its sale in Europe, reaping great revenues from it. 

After losing to the league's forces at the Battle of Agnadello, Venice found its holdings in Italy shrinking drastically. Soon Padua, Venice's most strategically vital Terraferma holding, had fallen, and Venice itself was threatened. Loredan united the population, calling for sacrifice and total mobilisation. Padua was retaken, though Venice was still forced to accept a reluctant peace, following which it joined the Pope as only a junior ally in his new war against the French. The alliance was on the verge of victory, but a dispute arose over territory. Emperor Maximilian refused to surrender any Imperial territory, which in his eyes included most of the Veneto, to the Republic; to this end, he signed an agreement with the Pope to exclude Venice entirely from the final partition. When the Republic objected, Julius threatened to reform the League of Cambrai. In response, Venice turned to Louis; on 23 March 1513, a treaty pledging to divide all of northern Italy between France and the Republic was signed at Blois. Under this alliance with the French King Louis XII, the Venetians achieved a decisive victory over the Papal States, and were able to secure back all the territories they had lost. In addition, the Papacy, namely Pope Leo X, a Medici, was forced to repay many outstanding debts to the Loredan family totalling approximately 500,000 ducats, an enormous amount of money.

Around this time, Leonardo's cousin Andrea Loredan, known as a collector of art, commissioned the Ca' Loredan Vendramin Calergi, a palace on the Grand Canal, to designs by Mauro Codussi. The palace was paid for by the doge. Andrea also commissioned and paid for the choir of the church of San Michele in Isola, also designed by Codussi. In 1513, during the War of the League of Cambrai, he had to accept the role of quartermaster-general for the army, and he died in the Battle of La Motta in the same year, beheaded by two soldiers who fought over his body.

The end of the war and the behavior of the doge, who perhaps thought he should enjoy the last years of his life rather than dedicate them to the administration of the state, led to a certain frivolity in Venetian society. Financial scandals were the order of the day and many public offices were bought at disproportionate prices rather than obtained on merit. In this period the doge bought titles and offices for children and relatives, making the most of his influence.

Despite Loredan's wishes, he could not lead this pleasant life for long as he began to suffer from health problems. Around the first days of June 1521 his health began to deteriorate and soon gangrene developed in his leg. Any intervention was useless and the gangrene spread, killing him in the night between 20 and 21 June. It is said that, to warn the councilors and regents of the state, the news of his death was silenced by the doge's own son and was communicated only in the late morning.

Interestingly, the commercialism and non-exemplary behaviour of his final years did not escape the watchful eye of the Inquisitors of the Dead, a magistracy created after the death of Francesco Foscari, charged with investigating the final "account" of the doge. Perhaps the trial was artfully mounted for political purposes but certainly there were incriminating motives, because the heirs of the doge, despite being defended by the lawyer Carlo Contarini, one of the best of the time, were sentenced to a hefty fine of 9,500 ducats.
Leonardo Loredan died in Venice on 22 June 1521. The death, which occurred between eight and nine, was kept secret until sixteen at the behest of the children who, during their father's agony, had no regard for transporting furniture and objects from the doge's apartment to their residence. As is customary, the body was subjected to embalming practices. On the morning of 23 June, after the body was moved to the Piovego room of the Doge's Palace, the coffin was closed. At the solemn funeral the eulogy was read by the scholar Andrea Navagero, and Pietro Bembo, then abbot and secretary of Pope Leo X, was also present.

Loredan died "with great fame as a prince". He was interred in the church of Santi Giovanni e Paolo, in a simple tomb with a celestial marble headstone without inscription, placed above the steps of the main altar and now no longer existing. In about 1572, and after some disputes between the Loredan heirs and the friars of the church, a funeral monument was erected for him, divided into three parts and adorned with Corinthian columns in Carrara marble, placed to the left of the main altar, with architecture by Girolamo Grappiglia, and adorned with an extremely lifelike statue, an early work by the sculptor Girolamo Campagna, which depicts him in the act of "getting up and boldly throwing himself in defence of Venice against Europe conspired in Cambrai". On its right was the statue of Venice with sword in hand and on the left that of the League of Cambrai, with the shield adorned with the heraldic coats of arms of the opposing powers (these, and the others in the monument were done by Danese Cattaneo, a pupil of Sansovino).

In the dramatic events of the early 16th century, Loredan's Machiavellian plots and struggles against the League of Cambrai, the Ottomans, the Mamluks, the Pope, the Republic of Genoa, the Holy Roman Empire, the French, the Egyptians and the Portuguese saved Venice from downfall.

Numerous portraits of Doge Leonardo Loredan have been painted, most famous of which are those by Giovanni Bellini and Vittore Carpaccio. The Panegyricus Leonardo Lauredano was created in 1503 in his honour.

Leonardo Loredan was succeeded by Doge Antonio Grimani in 1521, who was married to Leonardo's sister, Dogaressa Caterina Loredan: “The Loredanian tradition for patriotism and nobility was handed on in the gracious personage of Dogaressa Caterina Loredan, sister of Doge Leonardo Loredan – the Consort of his successor Doge Antonio Grimani.” They had several children, including cardinal Domenico Grimani.

Taddea Caterina Loredan, Duchess of the Archipelago, known as "a lady of wisdom and great talent", was the wife of Francesco III Crispo, who was mentally ill and was known as the "Mad Duke". Francesco attacked her in August 1510; Taddea tried to escape from him, and she fled to the castle of her cousin Lucrezia Loredan, Lady of Ios and Therasia, where Francesco had followed her a day later and attacked her again, on 17 August 1510, now murdering her. Their son John IV Crispo became the next Duke of the Archipelago in 1517, after a regency period during which he was still too young to rule. A 1908 book by historian William Miller titled "The Latins in the Levant, a History of Frankish Greece" indicates that the regent of the Duchy from 1511 to 1517 was Taddea's brother Antonio Loredan.

In 1535, Venice ceded the town of Barban in Istria (today part of Croatia) to the Loredan family, which had acquired it in an auction, as a heritable possession. The family made it their summer residence.

In 1536, the Loredan family acquired what would soon become the Palazzo Loredan in Campo Santo Stefano. Before the restoration by the architect Antonio Abbondi, it was a group of adjacent buildings, in the Gothic style, belonging to the Mocenigo family. The purchased buildings were substantially restored and made into a single building for the residence of the Loredans of Santo Stefano.

Marco Loredan (1489-1557) was a senator and politician, as well as Count of Brescia, Feltre, Rovigo, Salò and Famagusta, presiding over a time of famine and poverty following the War of the League of Cambrai.

Marco Loredan (d. 1577) was a priest and senator who was appointed by Pope Julius II as the Bishop of Nona (today Nin, Croatia), a position which he held from 1554 to 1577. He was also appointed by Pope Gregory XIII as the Apostolic Administrator and Archbishop of Zara (today Zadar, Croatia), where he stayed from 1573 until his death on 25 June 1577.Pietro Loredan, born in 1482, became the 84th Doge of Venice and the second doge that the Loredan family gave. He was the third son of Alvise di Polo di Francesco Loredan, and his mother, Isabella Barozzi, came from one of the oldest Venetian noble families. Pietro had an intense but not necessarily prestigious political career, which he accompanied with the care of commercial interests according to the family tradition. Pietro married Maria Pasqualigo, and then Maria Lucrezia di Lorenzo Capello, with whom he had a son, Alvise Loredan (1521-1593), who continued the lineage with numerous offspring.

Present in 1509 and in 1510 in the defense of Padua and Treviso, he made his debut in public life in 1510 as a sopracomito. In April 1511 he was elected a Senator, and he intervened in the Senate, asking for the reduction of the sum that the Jews had to pay for their "conduct" and ruled in favor of a league with France, also willing to sell Cremona and Ghiara d'Adda in exchange for other territories. In 1513 he left again to defend Padua and Treviso and, available for military roles, he offered to fill the positions of administrator of the Stradioti and the administrator of Adria. He refused his appointment as consul in Alexandria in 1516, when he intensified his entrepreneurial activity: in 1517 Pietro, together with his brothers, armed a ship to transport pilgrims to the Holy Land and the following year he set up a market galley on the Alexandria route.

Business did not, however, distract him from public service, as evidenced by the various candidacies and the appointment in the College of the Twenty Wise Men, while his financial fortune allowed him to enter the committee of guarantors of Banco Priuli. In 1545 he was one of the nine electors of Doge Francesco Donà; between 1546 and 1549 he ran several times for the Council of Ten, in which, after another stint in the Senate (1549), he entered at the beginning of 1550, becoming its head. Later in the year he became ducal councilor for the Dorsoduro district. In the 1550s, Pietro consolidated his personal prestige, sat assiduously in the Senate, in the Council of Ten, as well as in the Signoria as ducal councilor. In 1559 he was included among the forty-one electors of Doge Girolamo Priuli.

On 29 November 1567 he was elected doge, which came as a surprise for him. "A man of 85 years, but very prosperous.", wrote of him the papal nuncio Giovanni Antonio Facchinetti, who would later become Pope Innocent IX. Considered a figure of little political importance, his dogeship was considered the most suitable because it was transitory and politically harmless. Religious and morally upright, educated, and of uncommon wisdom, Pietro was reluctant at the beginning, but in the two and a half years of his reign showed recognized qualities of balance and prudence.

Pietro Loredan died on 3 May 1570. On the 7th, the state funeral was organised in San Marco, instead of Santi Giovanni e Paolo, due to bad weather. Pietro's body was carried in the cloister of S. Giobbe and buried in the family ark.

Doge Pietro Loredan was portrayed in the ducal palace by Domenico Tintoretto and the painting placed in the Senate room, and by Jacopo Tintoretto for the one in the Scrutinio room.

In 1581 the Loredan family, namely the heirs of Andrea Loredan, sold the famous Palazzo Loredan Vendramin Calergi for 50,000 ducats to Eric II, Duke of Brunswick-Lüneburg who took loans to afford it.

In 1598, an incident occurred which resulted in an urban legend known as The Ghost of Fosco Loredan. In a burst of anger resulting from jealousy of his wife Elena who attracted many suitors, in this case her cousin of the Mocenigo family, Fosco Loredan murdered her at Campiello del Remèr by decapitating her, and was then ordered by her uncle, Doge Marino Grimani, to walk to Rome while carrying her disfigured body on his back to ask for the Pope's forgiveness, as he was the only one who could grant it to a noble of the rank of Loredan. After hearing the story, Pope Clement VIII did not want to see him, and, out of desperation, Fosco escaped the guards who were going to imprison him and went back to Venice, where he drowned himself in the Grand Canal. Supposedly, on the anniversary of his wife's killing, his ghost can be seen wandering the streets of Venice at night searching for peace, the peace he lost in the burst of anger on the night he tragically murdered his young wife.

17th century: Opera and the Accademia 

Giovanni Francesco Loredan, born in 1607, was a writer and politician. He was born in Venice as the son of Lorenzo Loredan and Leonora Boldù. When both of his parents died while he was very young, he was raised by his uncle Antonio Boldù and had as his teacher Antonio Colluraffi.

He divided his youth between hard study and an extravagant lifestyle. He attended the classes of renowned Aristotelian philosopher Cesare Cremoni in Padua and began, before 1623, to gather around him the group of scholars who then formed the Accademia degli Incogniti, also called the Loredanian Academy. As founder of the Accademia degli Incogniti and a member of many other Academies, he had close contact with almost all the scholars of his time. He and his circle played a decisive role in the creation of modern opera. In addition to literary activity, he also took part in public affairs. At twenty he was recorded in the Golden Book, but his career began quite late: in September 1632 he was elected 'Savio agli Ordini' and in 1635 he was Treasurer of the fortress of Palmanova. On his return he reorganized the Accademia degli Incogniti (1636) and, in 1638, despite attempts to avoid it, he was obliged, as the only descendant of his branch, to contract marriage with Laura Valier. He was then Provveditore ai Banchi (1640), 'Provveditore alle Pompe' (1642), and in 1648 he made the leap to the rank of avogador del Comùn that he held several times (1651, 1656 and 1657) and 'Provveditore alle Biave'(1653). He subsequently joined the offices of the State Inquisitor and became a member of the Council of Ten. In 1656 he entered the Minor Consiglio, that is, among the six patricians who, together with the doge, composed the Serenissima Signoria. However, he may then have been pushed out of office, as in the following years he no longer held important positions. In 1660 he was a Provveditore in Peschiera. The following year (13 August 1661) he died.

Dogaressa Paolina Loredan was the daughter of Lorenzo Loredan and wife of Doge Carlo Contarini, whom she married on 22 February 1600 in the Church of San Polo. She was an "immensely stout woman and incredibly plain-looking", and therefore she decided she would not appear in public due to fear of being mocked by the populace. On the façade of the Church of San Vitale, Giuseppe Guoccola sculptured the busts of Doge Carlo and Dogaressa Paolina Loredan, placed there in gratitude of their noble bequests to the clergy.

Interestingly, near the Palazzo Contarini-Sceriman and the nearby bridge, Leonardo Loredan (d. 1675) was found dead in a boat. The unexplained death was the source of many rumors, claiming accidental death, murder by relatives, or murder by the Inquisitors of the Republic.

In the second half of the century, his son Francesco Loredan (1656-1715) is notable as he was the Venetian ambassador to Vienna during the Treaty of Karlowitz peace negotiations.

18th century: Wealth, Enlightenment and the Republic's decline 
In June 1715, at the end of his last assignment, as a reformer at the University of Padua, Francesco Loredan fell ill and after twenty-two days he died, in the Palace of Santo Stefano, on 10 July 1715. He remained unmarried, and left a very respectable inheritance, increased over the years, despite the huge expenses incurred for the embassy, and consisting of properties in Venice and vast land holdings, embellished with prestigious manor houses, in the Venetian area, around Treviso and Padua, in the Veronese area and in the territories of Rovigo and Polesine, to his brother, Giovanni, also unmarried, and to his nephews, children of his brother Andrea.Francesco Loredan, born in 1685, was the 116th Doge of Venice and the third and last of the Loredan family. He served as Doge from 18 March 1752, until his death on 19 May 1762. Loredan was elected doge on 18 March 1752 but the announcement was made on 6 April, postponed because of Easter. By this point, the dogal figure had lost nearly all his power and he quickly adapted to this new situation. As Giacomo Nani wrote in 1756, Loredan was able to face the burdens of becoming doge and exercising the office because his family was one of those of the "first class", that is, "very rich" families. Prodigal and generous, he was described "father of the poor" in two paintings by Pietro Longhi. He did not have a particular interest in culture and had a limited library showing only a certain activism in the artistic field; in addition to being portrayed by minor painters such as Bartolomeo Nazzari and Fortunato Pasquetti, he designed the reconstruction of the commercial maps of territories and countries in the Sala dello Scudo in the ducal palace and the portraits of the last forty-six doges in the Sala dello Scrutinio. He also had Giuseppe Angeli fresco part of the noble floor of the family palace in S. Stefano. However, his more constant interest than himself was the management of the family estate, which at the time included numerous palaces and vast land holdings. One of the biggest issues in domestic politics at the time was the clash between the conservatives and the reformers. The latter wanted to substantially reform the Republic and sought to build internal reforms. The conservative pressure groups were able to block these plans and imprisoned or exiled the reformist leaders, such as Angelo Querini, an important figure of the Venetian Enlightenment. The Doge did not want to show favour to one side or the other, so he remained totally passive and limited his support to making it easier for the winning side, thereby losing his chance to change the fate of the dying republic. By impeding the development of the reformist ideas, he possibly caused the small economic boom which started around 1756 with the outbreak of the Seven Years' War. The neutrality of the Republic during this time allowed the merchants to trade in huge markets without competitors. The French defeat even allowed Venice to become the biggest market for eastern spices.Interestingly, in 1752, Francesco offered the Palazzo Loredan dell'Ambasciatore as a residence for the ambassador of the Holy Roman Empire, and the first Imperial ambassador to live there was Count Philip Joseph Orsini-Rosenberg. In 1759, Loredan was awarded the Golden Rose by Pope Clement XIII, becoming the first and only doge to obtain the award.

At one point the Doge, who was old and tired by then, seemed about to die but recovered and lived for another year, until his death on 19 May 1762. The funeral took place on 25 May, and he was buried in the basilica of Santi Giovanni e Paolo, in Leonardo Loredan's dogal tomb. The funeral cost an impressive sum of around 18,700 ducats, and was paid for by Francesco's brother Giovanni.

Interestingly, the famed author and adventurer Giacomo Casanova was locked in the notorious lead chambers under Francesco Loredan's government in 1755 for suspicious activities, from which he managed his spectacular escape.

During this time, the Loredan family was incredibly wealthy and owned numerous palaces.

The main line of the family branch of Santo Stefano ended in 1750 with Andrea di Girolamo Loredan who died young, and the branch became extinct in 1767 with the death of Giovanni Loredan, brother of Doge Francesco.

19th century: After the fall of Venice 

After the fall of the Republic of Venice in 1797, some branches of the family were named on the basis of Venetian toponyms: San Luca, San Giovanni in Bragora, San Pantaleone etc.

Antonio Francesco di Domenico Loredan held the title of count in the Austrian Empire, and his brothers were also listed in the official list of nobles.

Teodoro Loredan Balbi (Krk, 7 November 1745 - Novigrad, 23 May 1831) was the last Bishop of Novigrad, a position which he held from 1795 until his death on 23 May 1831. He was ordained a priest in 1768. His uncle, the Bishop of Pula, Giovanni Andrea Balbi, appointed him a canon scholastic, prosinodal examiner and inquisitor in his diocese. In 1795 he received his doctorate in theology from the University of Padua, and in the same year Pope Pius VI appointed him as Bishop of Novigrad. Sudden political changes caused by the Napoleonic Wars soon followed: the collapse of the Venetian Republic in 1797, a brief change in Austrian and French rule, and the eventual establishment of Austrian rule in Istria after the Congress of Vienna in 1815. Although he did not get involved in the political events of the time, Napoleon's authorities detained him for 10 months in Venice after a trial, where he experienced all sorts of humiliations. After returning to the seat, he was for a time the only bishop in Istria and, under the authority of the Holy See, he visited the dioceses of Poreč and Pula. At the suggestion of Holy Roman Emperor Francis I, Pope Leo XII abolished the Diocese of Novigrad in 1828, which became part of the Diocese of Trieste, but, according to the Pope's order, only after Teodoro's death. As a bishop he sent three letters to the Holy See, in 1798, 1802 and 1807; in them he reported that in the diocese there were one cathedral and one choir church, 17 parishes, and many fraternities; that he opened a seminary and a pawnshop, founded a canonry of theologians and penitents, etc. He was buried in the church of St. Agatha in Novigrad, and his remains were transferred in 1852 to the bishop's tomb in the cathedral.

20th century: Villas and wineries 

In the 1950s, Count Piero Loredan, descendant of Doge Leonardo Loredan, founded the Conte Loredan Gasparini winery. He chose the territory of Vignigazzu to establish his home in a grand Palladian villa - The Villa Loredan at Paese. The winery is located in Venegazzù di Volpago del Montello, in the Veneto region, in the heart of the Marca Trevigiana, an area famous for the production of wines since the 16th century.

In the 1960s, Countess Nicoletta Loredan Moretti degli Adimari founded the Barchessa Loredan winery, located in Selva del Montello, within a 16th-century Palladian barchessa. The Barchessa Loredan is a magnificent example of Palladian architecture. The noble residence was built in the 16th century; originally it was part of a vast complex which also included a large villa destroyed in 1840. The imposing Barchessa remains of the original complex, with the entrance gates and part of the surrounding wall. The building consists of nine arches with a volute keystone and framed by Doric pilasters supporting a molded entablature, which extends over the entire ground floor. Above the portico rises the first floor, with a very large attic, perfectly restored, in which the most significant memories of the Loredan family are preserved.

In the 1980s, after the death of her husband Antonio Rizzardi, Countess Maria Cristina Rizzardi Loredan found herself managing the Guerrieri Rizzardi winery, based on Lake Garda, which she expanded with new vineyards and wines, also applying the concept of ‘Cru’ as a mark of quality restricted to a well-defined vineyard. She then became President of the Garda Oil Protection Consortium in 1984, and obtained the recognition of the extra virgin olive oil in Garda DOP. In 2010 she was awarded with the Order of Merit for Labour by the President of Italy.

Heraldry 
Coat of arms

The coat of arms of the Loredan family features a shield of yellow (top) and blue (bottom) with six laurel (or rose) flowers pictured on it; three in the yellow and three in the blue area. On top of the crest stands the corno ducale, the ceremonial crown and well-known symbol of the Doge of Venice. It is displayed on multiple buildings and palaces across the territories previously held by the Republic of Venice; from the Veneto and Friuli, Istria and Dalmatia, and in the more distant possessions such as the Ionian Islands and Crete. In Venice, it is even carved into the Rialto Bridge and the façade of St. Mark's Basilica.Motto

The beautiful façade of the Ca' Loredan Vendramin Calergi made of Istrian stone holds the Latin inscription: NON NOBIS DOMINE. The verse is derived from the Old Testament (Psalm 115:1) and was the beginning of a famous motto inscribed onto the war flag of the Knights Templar: "Nōn nōbīs, Domine, nōn nōbīs, sed nōminī tuō dā glōriam" (KJV: "Not unto us, O Lord, not unto us, but to thy name give the glory."). The verse symbolised the gratitude and humility of the Templars who, during the Crusades, fought for the glory of God and not for personal gain. It is known that Andrea Loredan, the commissioner of the palace, was close to the ideas and legacy of the Templars, so the biblical verse subsequently became the motto of the Loredan family as a whole. Due to his interest in the history of the Templars, it is even believed that his palace was one of the meeting places of the Order of Venice. Andrea, however, was not only a military general, but also a humanist protector of the arts and, in fact, he put considerable energy and capital into the palace to obtain a dwelling worthy of his value and the dignity of his family. The oak leaves around the inscription represented in Latin tradition the defender of the city, that is, one who is committed to the public good, a theme much loved by the Venetian nobility of the time. With this inscription, Andrea Loredan almost seems to want to conceal his incredible wealth, thus displaying a strong sense of humility and devotion to the Lord. The essence of the Loredan motto is, in fact, a display of piety and humility coming from a very powerful family.

Titles 

Throughout history, members of the Loredan family held numerous noble and political titles, some of which include:

Genealogy 
It is worth noting that all of the cadet branches most likely share a common ancestor, presumably Marco Loredan, as he was ascribed to the Great Council of the Republic in 1080, according to the 16th-century philosopher Jacopo Zabarella.

Note: The genealogical trees were constructed mainly from information provided in the Dizionario Biografico degli Italiani.

Note: The only complete genealogical tree is that of the branch of Santo Stefano; genealogical trees of other branches are partial and do not feature recent members.

Santo Stefano

Note:  The branch of Santo Stefano is also known as the branch of San Vidal (San Vitale).

Note: There are some generations missing between Girolamo Loredan (1468-1532) and Francesco Loredan (17th century).

Note: Giustina Giustiniani (d. 1500), the wife of Doge Leonardo Loredan (1436-1521), is also known as Morosina Giustiniani.

Note: Caterina Loredan, Dogaressa of Venice, is featured in the family tree as the daughter of Gerolamo Loredan (d. 1474) and Donata Donà because, in some sources, she is mentioned as the sister of Doge Leonardo Loredan (1436-1521), although she may have been a daughter of Domenico Loredan.

Interestingly, near the Palazzo Contarini-Sceriman and the nearby bridge, Leonardo Loredan (d. 1675) was found dead in a boat. The unexplained death was the source of many rumors, claiming accidental death, murder by relatives, or murder by the Inquisitors of the Republic.

Andrea Loredan (d. 1750) died young, thus ending the male (agnatic) line of the branch of Santo Stefano.

San Pantaleone della Frescada

Note: Alvise Loredan and Elena Emo had many children, but only Elisabetta Loredan Foscari is featured in the family tree.

Pietro Loredan (1482-1570) reigned as the 84th Doge of Venice from 1567 until his death in 1570.

San Cancian

Note: In the Venetian language, Pietro Loredan (1372-1438) was known as Piero Loredan.

Note: Besides the four sons and a daughter listed in the tree, Lorenzo Loredan and Marina Contarini had two other sons, Bortolo and Piero, but they died at childbirth.

Santa Maria Formosa

                                                   

  

Note: Giacomo Loredan (1396-1471) and Beatrice Marcello had several children, although only Antonio Loredan and Luca Loredan are featured in this genealogical tree.

Note: Antonio Loredan (1420-1482) and Orsola Pisani had many children, although only three sons (Giovanni, Marco, Jacopo) are featured in this genealogical tree.

Santa Maria Nova

Note: Alvise Loredan (d. 1502) and Argentina Vincenzina Contarini had 10 children - 4 sons and 6 daughters, although only Alessandro, Lorenzo and Marco Loredan (1489-1557) are featured in the genealogical tree.

Note: Besides the five sons listed, Marco Loredan (1489-1557) and Elisabetta Contarini also had daughters.

Alvise Loredan (d. 1502) was a military general.

Alvise Loredan (1533-1560) was assassinated in 1560.

Giovanni Loredan (1537-1571) was killed in the Echinades, Ionian Sea, as a commander of a galley in the Battle of Lepanto.

Polo Loredan (1540-1493) was the one to continue the lineage.

Ducal line in Greece

Notable members
Doges of Venice 

The family contributed three Doges: Leonardo Loredan (1501–1521), Pietro Loredan (1567–1570), and Francesco Loredan (1752–1762), of whom only the first truly set his mark on the history of Venice; the Portrait of Doge Leonardo Loredan by Giovanni Bellini (1501) makes his face familiar still.

Other members

Marco Loredan lived in the 11th century and is possibly the oldest known ancestor of the Loredan family, besides Gaius Mucius Scaevola, who is considered the traditional progenitor of the family. According to the 16th-century philosopher Jacopo Zabarella, Marco was ascribed to the Great Council of the Republic in 1080, due to his family's nobility and wealth.

Zanotto Loredan is known for an event which took place in the early 14th century; in 1316, he was seriously ill, so much so that it was thought he was dead, so the people took him to the church of San Matteo in Murano for burial. After the funeral rite, they wanted to deposit the body in the tomb, when someone noticed that the color of his face had changed. They took him to the convent hospital, warmed him and he recovered. Later he continued to live normally, married and had children.

Paolo Loredan (d.~1372) was a military general who distinguished himself in the highest positions at land and sea.

Admiral Pietro Loredan (1372-1438), a famous member of the family, achieved two great victories, against the two rivals for power in the Mediterranean: over the Ottoman Turks at the Battle of Gallipoli in June 1416, and over the Republic of Genoa near Rapallo in 1431. His attempt at being elected Doge of Venice was unsuccessful in 1423: he was defeated by his lifelong rival Francesco Foscari. Loredan was named general of the Republic in 1436 during a war with Mantua and was elected generalissimo in 1438, and was assassinated soon after.

Alvise Loredan (1393–1466) was a Venetian politician and commander of the fleet.

Giacomo Loredan (1396-1471) was a general and was elected Procuratore di San Marco de Citra in 1467.

Giorgio Loredan (d. 1475) was an admiral, military general and politician, known for investigating political crimes and scandals as head of the Council of Ten.Antonio Loredan (1420–1482) was the captain of Venetian-held Scutari and governor of Split (Venetian Dalmatia), Albania Veneta, and Morea. He is best known for the successful defense of Scutari in 1474. According to some sources, when the Scutari garrison complained for lack of food and water, Loredan told them: "If you are hungry, here is my flesh; if you are thirsty, I give you my blood." He is also notable for commissioning the Legend of Saint Ursula (1497/98), a series of large wall-paintings by Vittore Carpaccio originally created for Scuola di Sant'Orsola which was under the patronage of the Loredan family.

Taddea Caterina Loredan, Duchess of the Archipelago, was the wife of Francesco III Crispo, known as the "Mad Duke", who murdered her in 1510.

Antonio Loredan (1446-1514) was the Duke of Friuli, and ambassador the Papal States, the Kingdom of France and the Holy Roman Empire.

Andrea Loredan (1455-1499) was an admiral and the Duke of Corfu.

Pietro Loredan was appointed captain of two Venetian galleys by Doge Nicolò Marcello in 1473–74.

Tommaso Loredan was given a commission as captain of two Venetian galleys in 1490 by Doge Agostino Barbarigo.

Andrea Loredan is known for commissioning the Ca' Loredan Vendramin Calergi to designs by Mauro Codussi. The Bust of Andrea Loredan, which is today featured in the Museo Correr, was sculptured by Antonio Rizzo, one of the greatest architects and sculptors of the Venetian Renaissance. Joseph Lindon Smith depicted the bust in one of his paintings, which is today kept in the Harvard Art Museums.Marco Loredan was a senator and politician, as well as Count of Brescia, Feltre, Rovigo, Salò and Famagusta.

Fosco Loredan was a nobleman known for the murder of his wife in 1598, which resulted in an urban legend known as The Ghost of Fosco Loredan.

Giovanni Loredan, Lord of Antiparos, is notable for building the Castle of Antiparos in 1440 and bringing inhabitants to the island at his own expense. His daughter was Lucrezia Loredan, Lady of Antiparos.

Bartolomeo, Girolamo, Antonio and Zorzi Loredan were counts of Zara in the 17th and 18th centuries, while Antonio, Luigi, Giacomo and Girolamo Loredan were among the counts of Spalato.

Marco Loredan and Antonio Loredan were dukes of Morea in the 18th century, and some members of the family were dukes of Candia.

Further politicians were Giacomo Loredan (1396–1471), Giorgio Loredan (before 1404–1475), Antonio Loredan (1446–1514), Marco Loredan (1489–1557), Giovanni Francesco Loredan (1607–1661), Francesco Loredan (1656–1715), ambassador to Vienna.

Among literary figures, Giovanni Francesco Loredan (1607–1661) is remembered for the Accademia degli Incogniti, also known as the Loredanian Academy, that he founded in 1630.

Giovanni Loredan (lat. Ioannes Lauredanus), served as the Bishop of Koper from 1390 until his death on 22 April 1411.

Marco Loredan (d. 1577) served as the Bishop of Nin from 1554 to 1577 and as the apostolic administrator and Archbishop of Zara from 1573 until his death in 1577.

Teodoro Loredan Balbi (1745-1831) was an inquisitor in Pula and was anointed Bishop of Novigrad by Pope Pius VI in 1795, a position which he held until his death in 1831.

Influence 

Istria 

Barban and Rakalj

On 23 December 1535, the Loredan family acquired the town of Barban in Istria (today part of Croatia) for 14,760 ducats, and ownership was held by the brothers Leonardo, Lorenzo and Francesco, of the Santo Stefano branch. At the time, Barban also included Rakalj, and the two territories were organized as a separate feud owned by the Loredan family, who owned it until the abolition of feudal rights in 1869.

When the family acquired the towns, they built a palace in Rakalj, where they first settled. However, in 1606, the already existing castle in Barban was transformed into the family palace that still holds the Loredan coat of arms to this day. Still, the family made the town of Rakalj their summer residence due to its more pleasant climate and coastal location. The family managed the feud through their officer who held the title of captain.

The Loredan Terminations

“The Loredan Terminations” were written orders of the Loredan family. They were created for the purpose of communication between the masters who were in Venice and the family representatives in Istria. From them we can learn about the internal structure of the feud. The captain had political and judicial power, and was appointed by the Loredans. He had to reside permanently on the estate and participate in the election of prefects, deputy prefects and other officials. He had a chancellor who recorded all the documents in special books, and he also took care of the distribution of grain. Twelve judges, the prefect and the deputy prefect took care of the supply, solved smaller disputes and imposed lesser sentences. Church and fraternal goods were managed by the gastald and the municipal money was collected by the chamberlain. The Loredan terminations also deal with the prohibition of deforestation, management of municipal property, maintenance of cleanliness, burial of the dead, running of the fair, teaching of religion, civil law provisions, etc.

Since the Loredans were the feudal owners of the towns, all residents from that area had a number of obligations to the family. The first painful obligation was - selling wine. The wine had to be sold to the inn chosen by the Loredans, at a price defined by the Loredans. Then the innkeeper would continue to sell the same wine at a much higher price, giving a percentage to the Loredans. In a situation like this, the villagers would get an awfully low price so they preferred to hide their wine in "unofficial" taverns, smuggling it and selling it on the black market. The outcome of this was that, in really good years, the Loredans had a very low income from the wine. Villagers would explain that the wine was drunk by their family members "so there was not much left to sell to the innkeeper". That is why the Loredans announced their first official decision (Termination) on 6 October 1614. The decision determined in advance how much wine each family must sell to the innkeeper, whether the year was good or bad. By their decision the Loredans prohibited the wholesale of wine, or the sale of wine at a price different from the one they defined. There were also penalties for violation of the decision: whipping, imprisonment or exile to a galley. Since one decision did not solve anything, more decisions soon followed. However, the people weren't born yesterday; each decision they cunningly bypassed. To avoid one of the decisions the peasants started to pour water into wine which they had to sell to the innkeeper. As soon as the Loredans discovered the trick, they announced a new decision - pouring water into wine was forbidden. The next decision, due to the poor quality of the wine, determined the exact date when vintage begins... and so on.

The Terminations are kept in the Croatian State Archives in Rijeka.

Pula

Many family members served as the Chief Executive of Pula, holding the titles of Count and Provveditore.

Giovanni Loredan (lat. Ioannes Lauredanus), served as the Bishop of Koper from 1390 until his death on 22 April 1411. He is buried in the Cathedral of the Assumption of the Blessed Virgin Mary in Koper, Slovenia. In some historical sources he is mentioned by the name of Giacomo or Slovenian Jakob.

Teodoro Loredan Balbi (1745-1831) was an inquisitor in Pula and was anointed Bishop of Novigrad by Pope Pius VI in 1795. After the Congress of Vienna, he performed visits in the Diocese of Poreč and Pula as the only bishop present in Istria.

Dalmatia 

Besides Istria, the family also made their mark in Dalmatia.
Pietro Loredan, Giorgio and Lorenzo Loredan were counts of Zara (today Zadar, Croatia) in the 15th century, while Bartolomeo, Girolamo, Antonio and Zorzi Loredan held that title in the 17th and 18th centuries, where they would have resided in the Rector's Palace. As Count of Zara and Duke of Dalmatia, Pietro Loredan is notable for commissioning the Zadar city walls (Bedemi), which are today listed on the UNESCO World Heritage Sites as "Venetian Works of Defence between the 16th and 17th centuries: Stato da Terra – Western Stato da Mar"'''.

Although most Venetian nobles usually came to Dalmatian cities on political or military duty, and stayed until the end of their term, branches of some Venetian noble families, such as the Loredans, the Venier, and the da Mosto families, settled in and around Zara. A part of the Santa Maria branch of the Loredan family has been settled on the Dalmatian island of Ugljan (today part of Croatia) since the 18th century. Descendants today still live on the island, as well as in London.

 
Marco Loredan (d. 1577) served as the Bishop of Nin from 1554 to 1577 and as the apostolic administrator and Archbishop of Zara from 1573 until his death in 1577.

Antonio Loredan, Luigi, Girolamo, Giacomo and Domenico were among the counts of Spalato (today Split, Croatia).

Throughout history, members of the family were also influential in numerous other Dalmatian towns and cities.

Montenegro 

Three members of the family served as governors of the Venetian-held Bay of Kotor (today part of Montenegro) in the 16th, 17th and 18th centuries.

Albania 

A distinct feature of Venetian rule in Albania was the tendency of Venetian administrators to use their official duties in order to pursue personal interests. The Loredan family is an example of how Venetian aristocratic but nevertheless elected officials mingled state duties with profitable, private commercial transactions. The family was involved in numerous business ventures along the Albanian coast, with notable members in Albania including Giorgio Loredan, Count and Captain of Durazzo in the 1410s, and Giuliano Loredan, Viscount of Durazzo in the 1420s. Andrea Loredan had the same position in Drivasto, where he robbed the city of all the money and disappeared with it. The Signoria condemned him in absentia in 1410. Fabrizio Loredan was Count of Durazzo in the 1430s and was known as “Ser Fabricius de Durachio”. He engaged in illegal trade with the Ottoman Turks, from whom he purchased horses at a low price and sold them afterwards at a great profit. The Senate punished his actions in 1425. In 1431, Fabrizio was using the citizens of Cattaro as commercial correspondents in Albania and Ragusa. With ships hired in Cattaro, his correspondents were looking after the interests of the Loredan family in Durazzo, Scutari, Alessio and Budua. Loredan was also transporting grain from Albanian to Dalmatian ports, and was furthermore involved in complicated commercial activities involving Albania, Dalmatia and the Italian states. Administrators such as these considered their short-term official appointments across the State of the Sea as opportunities to accumulate as much personal wealth as possible through various ventures, including smuggling prohibited items, robbing the locals and cheating the Venetian government. Such practices were strongly forbidden and constantly punished by the state, which, despite continuous efforts to direct all overseas trade profits to its coffers, seemed at times unable to control and eradicate the rampant corruption of its own officials.

The most notable family member significant in Albania was Antonio Loredan (1420-1482), who was the captain of Venetian-held Scutari (today Shkodër) and governor of Venetian Albania. He is best known for the successful defence of Scutari against the Ottomans in 1474. According to some sources, when the Scutari garrison complained for lack of food and water, Loredan told them: "If you are hungry, here is my flesh; if you are thirsty, I give you my blood."

Greece 

Two Loredans were dukes of the Kingdom of the Morea and many were baili on Greek islands; a bailo was a diplomat who oversaw the affairs of the Republic of Venice in overseas territories. Members of the family also held titles Regent of the Archipelago, Duchess of the Archipelago, Lord of Antiparos, Lady of Antiparos, Lady of Ios, Lady of Therasia, Lady of Naxos and Lady of Paros.

Lordship of Antiparos

The family is significant for the island of Antiparos in the Aegean Sea. Apparently the Venetians did not pay much attention to the island which by the beginning of the 15th century was a pirate base and haven. This changed when the lord of the island became Giovanni Loredan, who had married Maria Sommaripa (d. 1446) from the family of the rulers of Paros, with whom he had a daughter Lucrezia Loredan (1446-1528), Lady of Antiparos. Loredan brought new inhabitants to the island at his own expense and built the Castle of Antiparos in 1440 which had a very specific and unique style of architecture. The castle and the island remained in the ownership of the House of Loredan until 1480 when they were given as a dowry to Domenico Pisani, son of the Duke of Crete who had married Fiorenza, the daughter of the Duke of Naxos.

Austria 

Francesco Loredan (1656-1715) was the Ambassador of the Republic to Vienna during the peace negotiations between the Ottoman Empire and the Holy League resulting in the Treaty of Karlowitz (1699).

Antonio Francesco di Domenico Loredan held the title of count in the Austrian Empire, and his brothers were also listed in the official list of nobles.

Wealth 

Throughout the Renaissance and the early modern period, the wealth of the Loredan family in Venice and the rest of the Republic was legendary, particularly from around 1500 to 1800, and especially in the 18th century, when the family owned numerous palaces and hundreds of estates across northeastern Italy and various other territories of the Republic.

In the Middle Ages 

Certain historians, such as Jacopo Zabarella, stated that the Loredans were already wealthy upon their arrival to Venice in the early 11th century, and some sources claimed they are descended from an illustrious ancient lineage originating in Rome. That is why Gaius Mucius Scaevola was at times boasted as the traditional progenitor of the family. While the ancient Roman origin of the Loredans has not been proven true or false, it is most likely true that they greatly increased their wealth in the lucrative silk and spice trade, as well as the slave trade, in the Middle Ages. After the travels of Marco Polo in the late 13th century, many Venetian merchants set out to establish trade companies in Asia, and the Loredans were no exception, with the family already sending out and operating trade convoys to Egypt, Persia, India and China by the 1330s.

Besides the now established trading activities, some sources point to instances of piracy and notorious organised usury by family members in the 13th and 14th centuries, of which they were accused multiple times but managed to avoid charges by means of threats or bribery. The wealth which came from these activities was then put into building some of the Loredan palaces in Venice.

In the 15th century, the family came into possession of the Aegean island of Antiparos, with Giovanni Loredan building the Castle of Antiparos in 1440 and bringing inhabitants to the island at his own expense. At this time, the branch of the family which was settled in the Aegean married into the ruling families of other Greek islands, with Antonio Loredan even briefly ruling the Duchy of the Archipelago as regent in the early 16th century while his nephew and future duke John IV Crispo was still a child.

In the Renaissance and the early modern period 
The family's wealth started to significantly increase with the start of the 16th century, mainly due to increased power and influence arising from Leonardo Loredan’s election as Doge in 1501. Besides being one of the most important rulers in the history of Venice, Leonardo was a very capable merchant and businessman from a young age, devoting himself to trade in Africa and the Levant, thus increasing the family's finances. Leonardo Loredan would rule for twenty years, until 1521, during which time, and due to his cunning political and wartime military maneuvers, the family grew to be incredibly wealthy and powerful. In the War of the League of Cambrai, after making an alliance with the King of France Louis XII, Leonardo led Venice to a victory against the Papal States, after which the Pope was forced to repay many outstanding debts to the Loredan family totalling approximately 500,000 ducats, an obscene amount of money. For comparison purposes, a century earlier Venice acquired the entire coastal region of Dalmatia from Hungary for 100,000 ducats.

Towards the end of his reign, financial scandals became the order of the day in Venice, and many public offices and positions were bought at disproportionate prices. The doge did not hesitate to make the most of his influence, and many titles and offices were bought for his children and relatives. After his death, and due to the questionable behaviour in his final years, the family was sued and sentenced to a hefty fine of 9,500 ducats, despite being defended by Carlo Contarini, one of the best lawyers of the time. While this would mean that there was an incriminating element to Leonardo's actions, the trial was nevertheless artfully mounted for political purposes by rival families.

At the time, many beautiful and iconic palaces were acquired and built, including the Palazzo Loredan dell’Ambasciatore, the Ca’ Loredan Vendramin Calergi and the Palace of Santo Stefano. Of particular significance is the impressive Ca’ Loredan Vendramin Calergi, which the heirs of Andrea Loredan sold in 1581 for 50,000 ducats to the Eric II, Duke of Brunswick-Lüneburg, who had to take loans to be able to afford it.

On the family's colossal wealth in the 18th century, it is enough to look at the reported revenues and spending habits of just one man, Francesco Loredan, who became Doge in 1752. According to the historian Giacomo Nani, Francesco was able to face the burdens of becoming doge and exercising the office because his family was one of those "first class", that is, "very rich" families. In 1741 he declared revenues of nearly 11,000 ducats; in 1758 alone he spent almost 43,000 for dogal endeavours and when he died, his income exceeded 118,000 ducats. This was joined by the very extensive family landholdings. The costs of election feasts have often been incorrectly estimated, even by contemporaries (a 1772 writing in the Loredan files speaks of 90,000 ducats, while Samuele Romanin estimates them to be around 21,700). The surviving list of the individual items, however, allows us to estimate the cost at just over 38,600 ducats (of these, 2310 for the orchestra, 7635 for refreshments, 5800 donated to the people and 2140 to the arsenalotti). The figure for the celebrations seems incredibly high, with Romanin estimating it to be much higher than previous doges and unsurpassed by several successors. Despite this, one of the sonnets composed for the occasion complained of insufficient results, mocking the music and claiming that the "machine" of fireworks had funerary references. The expenses in the first year of his dogeship are also impressive, spending more than 117,000 ducats, including 6250 spent on furs. His more constant interest than himself, however, was the management of the family estate. In addition to the famous palace, two buildings in S. Stefano and a house in San Basso, from the tithing census of 1739 and from other sources there were at least 76 houses and shops owned in various districts of Venice and Mazzorbo. There were also many buildings, agricultural lands and fields in the Venetian hinterland (Marghera, Meolo), in the Polesine (Canda, Anguillara Veneta, S. Martino di Venezze, Rovigo, Badia Polesine, Polesella) and in the Paduan area (Montagnana, Cittadella, Piove di Sacco, Altichiero), Trevigiano (Monastier, Conegliano, Asolo), Vicentino (Noventa Vicentina) and Verona, Friuli (Latisana) and Istria (Rovigno and Barban). Particularly important are the villas and land in Stra, Canda and Noventa Vicentina. It seems that these possessions, until 1755 in co-ownership with uncle Giovanni di Leonardo, brother of his father, largely dated back to the marriage, in the 1620s, of Francesca Barbarigo with Francesco Loredan, Loredan's great-grandfather. According to an estimate from 1755, the ex-Barbarigo lands yielded 11,000 ducats per year.

Estates

Palaces 

The Palazzo Loredan dell'Ambasciatore on the Grand Canal derived its popular name as the residence of the ambassador of the Holy Roman Empire, which was offered as a residence for the Imperial ambassador by Doge Francesco Loredan. The great collector in the family was Andrea Loredan who constructed a palazzo on the Cannaregio to designs by Mauro Codussi; it was paid for by Doge Leonardo Loredan; it was bought in the eighteenth century by the Vendramin family, and the Ca' Loredan Vendramin Calergi is notable today for its association with Richard Wagner. Palazzo Loredan in Campo S. Stefano is today the Venetian Institute of Science, Literature and Arts, and it holds the busts of famous Venetians which form the Panteon Veneto. Palazzo Loredan Cini, a Gothic style palace located on the Grand Canal, has a large collection of precious artworks which are on permanent display on the first floor of the palace. Ca' Loredan, whose main facade features polifora windows, is today home to the city's municipal council. The Palazzo Giustinian Loredan is still today owned by the family. Palazzo Loredan Gheltoff is a 14th/15th century early Gothic palace located at Calle dell'Aseo in the Cannaregio district of Venice. Palazzo Loredan a San Cancian is a palace of the San Cancian branch of the Loredan family located at Calle Larga Widmann in the Cannaregio district of Venice, near the Church of San Canciano after which it was named. The Loredan Palace in Barban was transformed from an already existing castle into a family residence in 1606. Giovanni Loredan, Lord of Antiparos, built the Castle of Antiparos in 1440 and brought new inhabitants to the island at his own expense.

Loredan villas

In the terraferma there are numerous Loredan villas - at Strà on the Brenta Canal; at Paese, near Treviso, the villa painted by Francesco Guardi; at Asolo; at Sant'Urbano, near Padua. The domain of the Villa Loredan at Paese was planted with grapevines in the 1950s by Count Pietro Loredan; the award-winning wine continues to be made under the label Conte Loredan Gasparini.

Depictions in art

Legacy

Impact on Jewish history

The Venetian Ghetto 

On March 29, 1516, by decree of Doge Leonardo Loredan, the Venetian Senate declared that if the Jews wanted to continue living in Venice, they had to stay on a small island surrounded by canals in the northern part of the city. By this decision, the first Jewish ghetto in the world was created in the Cannaregio district of Venice, thus starting centuries of segregation which would spread across Europe, and the Venetian word ghèto soon became a popular term to describe isolated urban communities of ethnic minorities. Scholars believe that the Loredan government which had established the Ghetto did so because they believed that the Jews could not be integrated with the city's mainly Roman Catholic population.

Life in the Ghetto was very restricted, and the movement of Jews outside of the ghetto was difficult. Jews were locked in the ghetto at night and Christian guards on boats patrolled the narrow canals and short bridges to enforce the rules. The Jews were even forced to pay the salaries of their Christian wardens. While appallingly discriminatory, it was, for some, a shelter from even worse persecution elsewhere.

Although it was home to a large number of Jews, accounting for 1,000 people out of the city's 160,000 at the time, and mainly consisting of merchants, the population living in the Venetian Ghetto never assimilated to form a distinct, "Venetian Jewish" ethnicity. Four of the five synagogues were clearly divided according to ethnic identity: separate synagogues existed for the German (the Scuola Grande Tedesca), Italian (the Scuola Italiana), Spanish and Portuguese (the Scuola Spagnola), and Levantine Sephardi communities (the Scuola Levantina). The fifth, the Scuola Canton, was possibly built as a private synagogue and also served the Venetian Ashkenazi community. At its peak in the middle of the 17th century, nearly 5,000 Jews lived in the Ghetto. To accommodate births and new arrivals, they could only build upwards, resulting in some of the world's first “skyscrapers,” which at seven or eight storeys are still some of the tallest buildings in the city.

In 1797, the French Army of Italy commanded by 28-year-old Napoleon Bonaparte occupied Venice, forcing the Republic to collapse on 12 May 1797, and ended the ghetto's separation from the city on 11 July of the same year. Today, the Ghetto is still a center of Jewish life in the city. The Jewish community of Venice, that counts about 450 people, is culturally active, although only a few members live in the Ghetto because the area has become increasingly expensive. Anniversary events are held in the ghetto and include a production of William Shakespeare’s play The Merchant of Venice and a major exhibition called "Venice, the Jews, and Europe", at the Doge's Palace - the same place where the decree that started the ghetto was signed 500 years ago.

Relationship with the Jewish community 
Despite playing a part in the creation of the first Jewish ghetto, the decision to do so was not only made by Leonardo Loredan, but by other senators who advocated for segregation believing that the presence of Jews in the city and their money lending practices would degrade the Christian morals and values of Venetian citizens. Later in the 16th century, some members of the Loredan family, including Pietro Loredan, fought in the Senate for the reduction of the sum the Jews had to pay for their “conduct”.

In the 17th century onwards, the Loredans were noted for supporting and taking in Jews arriving in Venice, several of whom adopted the “Loredan” name in recognition of the family's generosity. For instance, records exist of a Spanish Jewish family fleeing persecution in Spain who took the Loredan name after a member of the Loredan family sponsored their education and conversion to Christianity. As a result, descendants of these Loredan converts can be found in the former Venetian territories and the diaspora.

In the 18th century, as Captain General of the Sea, one Loredan wrote letters of recommendation for many Jews from Mediterranean cities and islands, and helped them with affording and boarding ships bound for Venice.

MV Loredan 

The MV Loredan was an Italian mixed motor ship and auxiliary cruiser of the Italian Royal Navy in World War II, named in honour of the many admirals of the Loredan family.

Built in 1936 in Monfalcone, it initially served as a civil transport ship on several lines in the Adriatic Sea. In 1941 it was registered as an auxiliary cruiser in the Italian Royal Navy. In twenty-one months of service, it carried out a total of 193 missions, consisting mainly of escort services in the Tyrrhenian Sea.

On 10 April 1943, it left the port of Cagliari as an escort to a small convoy headed for the archipelago of La Maddalena. Shortly after the departure, the convoy was spotted by the British submarine HMS Safari, which proceeded to launch torpedoes at the Italian ships, sinking the Loredan with nearly all her crew.

The wreck of the Loredan lies on its left side, with the stern severely damaged, at a depth of between 52 and 67 meters, on the seabed of the Gulf of Cagliari, at 39°08' N and 9°23' E. Today, she is a frequent diving destination.

A new Loredan cargo ship was subsequently built in 1946, and broken up in 1971.

Curiosities 

 In 1316, Zanotto Loredan was seriously ill, so much so that it was thought he was dead, so the people took him to the church of San Matteo in Murano for burial. After the funeral rite, they wanted to deposit the body in the tomb, when someone noticed that the color of his face had changed. They took him to the convent hospital, warmed him and he recovered. Later he continued to live normally, married and had children.
 In 1410, Andrea Loredan, who was Count of Drivasto, robbed the city of all its money and disappeared with it. The Signoria condemned him in absentia soon after.
 In the 1412 Battle of Motta, Pietro Loredan helped the Venetian military score a decisive victory over Hungary, by cunningly burning the bridges surrounding the Venetian camp so that fleeing Venetian troops could not escape following an unexpected Hungarian assault. This calculated decision completely changed the fortunes of the Venetians, rallying them back into combat, and ultimately securing their victory. Following the battle, Pietro ordered the bombardment of Motta, forcing the Hungarians to surrender the city.
 In the 1416 Battle of Gallipoli, Pietro Loredan managed to lead the Venetian fleet to victory over the Ottomans while being wounded by an arrow below the eye and the nose, and by another that passed through his left hand, as well as several other arrows that struck him with lesser effect. Following the battle, he took 1,100 Ottoman soldiers as captives, with most of them being sold into slavery afterwards.
In 1423, when Pietro Loredan lost the election for the dogeship to his fierce rival Francesco Foscari, two of Loredan's daughters, Maria and Marina, were deliberately married to Francesco Barbaro and Ermolao Donà respectively, both of them opponents of Foscari. Furthermore, when Foscari proposed a marriage between his own daughter and one of Loredan's sons, it was rejected.
Giovanni Bellini’s 1501 Portrait of Doge Leonardo Loredan is significant as it was the first portrait of an Italian ruler to be painted face-front. Previously, face-front portraits were reserved for holy figures, while mortals would be portrayed in profile to signify their spiritual incompleteness.
 During Leonardo Loredan’s reign,  in 1507, the events of the Fornaretto of Venice took place, the story of an innocent baker sentenced to death for an uncommitted murder. The story of the fornaretto, however, is not historical: it is the fruit of the imagination of the playwright Francesco Dall'Ongaro, who wrote it in 1846. 
At the height of the War of the League of Cambrai, and with Venice's resources diminishing, Doge Leonardo Loredan set a noble example by sending all of his gold and silver plates and the jewels of his late wife to the Mint to be melted down for money. In his speech before the Great Council, which was described as a model of patriotism and eloquence and greeted rapturously, he also invited other nobles to contribute as much money as possible in order to meet the enormous expenses of resistance.
 In the Latin inscription on the Tomb of Doge Leonardo Loredan, the year of his death is mistakenly written as MDXIX (1519) instead of MDXXI (1521).
In 1570, at the death of Doge Pietro Loredan, who tried to tackle food shortages of 1569/1570 by introducing bread made of millet, and who was held personally responsible for the famine, the people of Venice were heard singing: "Rejoice, rejoice! The Doge is dead, who gave us millet in our bread!" and "Long live our saints and lords of noble birth, dead is the Doge who brought upon us dearth!"
Another theory about Doge Pietro Loredan's death is that, instead of being struck with illness, he died a peaceful death in his villa in east Italy. There he was being fed grapes by his servants, and while eating, his mistress tried to start a conversation with him, leading Loredan to choke and suffocate on his grape. They tried to get the grape dislodged from his throat but to no avail.
In 1598, an incident occurred which resulted in an urban legend known as The Ghost of Fosco Loredan. In a burst of anger resulting from jealousy of his wife Elena who attracted many suitors, Fosco Loredan murdered her at Campiello del Remèr by decapitating her, and was then ordered by her uncle, Doge Marino Grimani, to walk to Rome while carrying her disfigured body on his back to ask for the Pope's forgiveness, as he was the only one who could grant it to a noble of the rank of Loredan. After hearing the story, Pope Clement VIII did not want to see him, and, out of desperation, Fosco went back to Venice and drowned himself in the Grand Canal. Supposedly, on the anniversary of his wife's killing, his ghost can be seen wandering the streets of Venice at night searching for peace.
Dogaressa Paolina Loredan made a decision never to appear in any public ceremonials out of fears that she would be mocked by the populace due to her being an immensely stout and unusually plain-looking woman.
In 1675, near the Palazzo Contarini-Sceriman and the nearby bridge, Leonardo Loredan was found dead in a boat. The unexplained death was the source of many rumors, claiming accidental death, murder by relatives, or murder by the Inquisitors of the Republic.
Despite the incredible amount of money Francesco Loredan spent on celebrations upon his ascension to the dogeship in 1752, one of the sonnets composed for the occasion complained of insufficient results, mocking the music and claiming that the "machine" of fireworks had funerary references.

Interestingly, the Loredans were one of the rare families in which feudal ownership of an estate could be inherited by a woman. The family's Istrian fief of Barban and Rakalj was the only feudal estate in Istria in which ownership could be passed down to a female heiress. This shows how the family was able to keep ownership of their Istrian lands until 1869, a century after the family branch of Santo Stefano, which had owned it, became extinct in the male line.
The MV Loredan ship, built in 1936 and named in honour of the many Loredan admirals throughout history, was torpedoed by British submarine HMS Safari on 10 April 1943, 10 miles off the coast of Sardinia, while carrying cargo from Cagliari to the archipelago of La Maddalena, serving as part of the Italian Navy in the Second World War. The ship sunk immediately with nearly all her crew. The wreck of the Loredan lies on its left side, with the stern severely damaged, at a depth of between 52 and 67 meters, on the seabed of the Gulf of Cagliari, at 39°08' N and 9°23' E. Today, she is a frequent diving destination. 
The feminine name Loredana, common in Italy and Romania, is derived from the name of the Loredan family. Notable people with the name include even the botanist and Dogaressa of Venice Loredana Marcello (1533 - 1572).

Loredan wineries

Conte Loredan Gasparini  

The Conte Loredan Gasparini winery was founded in the 1950s by Count Piero Loredan, descendant of the Doge of Venice Leonardo Loredan, who chose the territory of Vignigazzu to establish his home in a grand Palladian villa - The Villa Loredan at Paese.

The winery is located in Venegazzù di Volpago del Montello, in the Veneto region, in the heart of the Marca Trevigiana, an area famous for the production of wines since the 16th century.

Barchessa Loredan  

The Barchessa Loredan winery is located in Selva del Montello, within a 16th-century Palladian barchessa. It is owned by the Loredan family, who managed the latest renovation.

It directly produces and markets its wines obtained from D.O.C. Montello and D.O.C.G. Asolo. The farm covers an area of 50 hectares (124 acres) of vineyards in the hamlets of Selva and Venegazzù, and is managed by Countess Nicoletta Loredan Moretti degli Adimari, who founded it in the 1960s. The Barchessa, surrounded by vineyards, is also clearly visible from the Schiavonesca state road, (Montebelluna Conegliano) to which it is connected by a long avenue of centuries-old hazelnuts.

The Barchessa Loredan is a magnificent example of Palladian architecture. The noble residence was built in the 16th century; originally it was part of a vast complex which also included a large villa destroyed in 1840.

The imposing Barchessa remains of the original complex, with the entrance gates and part of the surrounding wall. The building consists of nine arches with a volute keystone and framed by Doric pilasters supporting a moulded entablature, which extends over the entire ground floor.

Above the portico rises the first floor, with a very large attic, perfectly restored, in which the most significant memories of the Loredan family are preserved.

Guerrieri Rizzardi  

In the 1980s, after the death of her husband Antonio Rizzardi, Countess Maria Cristina Rizzardi Loredan found herself managing the Guerrieri Rizzardi winery, based on Lake Garda. Carrying on from her husband, she further developed the estates and the vineyards, seeking out new international markets and developing new wines. She succeeded in expanding the winery with new vineyards and wines, also applying the concept of ‘Cru’ as a mark of quality restricted to a well-defined vineyard. The Countess would become a well-known figure in the wine world and her hard work, keen vision and determination were widely recognised. Her achievements were honoured in 2010 when she was the first woman from the region to be awarded the Order of Merit for Labour, Italy's highest honour for those who are meritorious business people in agriculture, commerce and industry.

Notes

References

Bibliography

 Barzman, Karen-edis (2017). The Limits of Identity: Early Modern Venice, Dalmatia, and the Representation of Difference. Brill. .
 Norwich, John Julius (2003). A History of Venice. Penguin UK. p. 594. .
 
Miller, William. The Latins in the Levant: A History of Frankish Greece (1204–1566). London: 1908.
Stahl, Alan M. (2009). "Michael of Rhodes: Mariner in Service to Venice". In Long, Pamela O. (ed.). The Book of Michael of Rhodes: A Fifteenth-Century Maritime Manuscript. Volume III: Studies. Cambridge, Massachusetts: MIT Press. pp. 35–98. .
Martines, Lauro (2012). Loredana: A Venetian Tale. .
 Maidalchini, Francesco. Il Loredano. Panegirico. Venice 1634.
 Brunacci, G. Vita di Giovan Francesco Loredan. Venice 1662.
 Lupis, Antonio. Vita di Giovan Francesco Loredan Senator Veneto. Venice 1663.
 Brocchi, V. L'accademia e la novella nel Seicento: Giovan Francesco Loredan, "Atti del R. Istituto veneto di scienze, lettere e arti", s. 7, IX (1897–98), pp. 284–311.
 Ivanoff, N. Giovan Francesco Loredan e l'ambiente artistico a Venezia nel Seicento, "Ateneo veneto", III 1965, pp. 186–190.
 Morini, A. Sous le signe de l'inconstance. La vie et l'oeuvre de Giovan Francesco Loredan (1606-1661), noble vénitien, fondateur de l'Académie des Incogniti, diss., Université de Paris IV, 1994.
 Morini, A. Giovan Francesco Loredan: sémiologie d'une crise, "Revue des études italiennes", XLIII 1997, pp. 23–50.
 Morini, A. Giovan Francesco Loredan (1606-1661): le retour à la bergerie, in: Soulèvements et ruptures: l'Italie en quête de sa révolution. Actes du Colloque du CSLI, a cura di B. Toppan, Nancy 1998, pp. 73–88.
Miato, M. L'Accademia degli Incogniti di Giovan Francesco Loredan. Venezia (1630-1661), Florence 1998.
Loredan, Giovanni Francesco. Morte del Volestein e altre opere, a c. di L. Manini, La Finestra editrice, Lavis 2015 .
 Rosand, Ellen, Opera in Seventeenth-Century Venice: the Creation of a Genre. University of California Press, 2007  .
 Zorzi, Ludovico (1998). Carpaccio e la rappresentazione di Sant'Orsola. Torino: Einaudi.
 Bertoša, Slaven (2005). Istarska enciklopedija. (on the Loredan Terminations and the Barban and Rakalj estate in Istria)
 Bertoša, Slaven (2012). Gli Orizzonti Mediterranei della Famiglia Veneziana Loredan.
 Morelli, Jacopo (1790). Della Istoria Viniziana di Monsignor Pietro Bembo Cardinale. Venice.
Romanin, Samuele. Storia documentata di Venezia, Venice 1859, pp. 96–142, 302. (on the spending amounts of Doge Francesco Loredan)
Nani, Giacomo (1752). Componimenti presentati al serenissimo principe F. Loredano doge di Venezia dalla città di Brescia. Brescia.
Nani, Giacomo (1756). Saggio politico del Corpo aristocratico della Repubblica di Venezia per l'anno 1756.
Gullino, G. (1985). I Loredan di Santo Stefano: Cenni storici. Venice.
 Merkel, E. (1985). Il mecenatismo artistico dei Loredan e il loro palazzo a Santo Stefano. Venice.
Pilot A. (1917). L'elezione e la morte del doge Francesco Loredan in tre sonetti inediti. pp. 168–170.
Simi, S. (1992). Considerazioni attorno un busto di Leonardo Loredan.
 Dizionario Biografico degli Italiani, Volume 65: Levis–Lorenzetti. Rome: Istituto dell'Enciclopedia Italiana. (individual biographies of many family members)
 Manfroni, Camillo (1934). Enciclopedia Italiana.
 Cessi, Roberto (1928). Venezia ducale, vol. 1. Padua.
 Musatti, Eugenio (1888). La storia della promissione ducale (in Italian). Padua.
 Da Mosto, Andrea. I Dogi di Venezia. Florence. 1983.
 Dumler, Helmut. Venedig und die Dogen. Düsseldorf. 2001.
 King, Margaret L. Umanesimo e patriziato a Venezia nel Quattrocento, vol. 1. Rome.
 Battista di Crollalanza, Giovanni (1965). Dizionario storico-blasonico delle famiglie nobili e notabili italiane estinte e fiorenti, vol. 2. Bologna. p. 32.
 Staley, Edgcumbe (1910). The Dogaressas of Venice: The Wives of the Doges. London: T.W. Laurie. (on the dogaressas Caterina and Paolina Loredan)
 Berendt, John (2005). The City of Falling Angels. Penguin Press. .
 Brusegan, Marcello (2005). La grande guida dei monumenti di Venezia. Rome: Newton & Compton. .
 Lorenzetti, G. (1974). Venezia e il suo estuario.
 Douglas, Hugh A. Venice on Foot.
 Zabarella, Jacopo (1646). Trasea Peto. Padua. (on the ancient Roman origin of the Loredans)
 Ughelli, Ferdinando (1653). Italia Sacra. Rome. (on the bishop Giovanni Loredan)
 Hierarchia Catholica, Vol. 3. p. 260. (on the bishop Marco Loredan)
 Les Ordinations Épiscopales, Year 1554. (on the ordination of the bishop Marco Loredan)

External links

 Famiglia Loredano at conoscerevenezia.it
Leonardo Loredan at treccani.it
Pietro Loredan at treccani.it
Francesco Loredan at treccani.it
 Pietro Loredan (admiral) at treccani.it
 Alvise Loredan at treccani.it
 Antonio Loredan at treccani.it
Andrea Loredan at treccani.it
Giovanni Francesco Loredan at treccani.it
Francesco Loredan (diplomat) at treccani.it
Marco Loredan at treccani.it
Giacomo Loredan at treccani.it
 Giorgio Loredan at treccani.it
Antonio Loredan (politician) at treccani.it
Portrait of Doge Leonardo Loredan at nationalgallery.org.uk
Portrait of Doge Leonardo Loredan at sothebysinstitute.com
Portrait of Doge Leonardo Loredan at independent.co.uk
Portrait of Doge Leonardo Loredan at the guardian.com
Portrait of Doge Pietro Loredan at kimbellart.org
Portraits of Leonardo and Pietro Loredan at artothings.com
Tomb of Doge Leonardo Loredan at academia.edu
Conte Loredan Gasparini winery
Barchessa Loredan winery
Palazzo Loredan Cini
Palazzo Loredan dell'Ambasciatore at vovcollection.com
Castle of Antiparos at kastra.eu
Panteon Veneto at istitutoveneto.org

L
Venetian noble families
Republic of Venice families